There are currently 71 pitchers and 47 records in the sub-1.00 ERA club:
 Note every player on the list played four seasons (except those currently with one year eligibility remaining) totaling at least 600 innings pitched.

Progression
Debbie Doom ended her career pitching a 9-inning win in the 1985 Women's College World Series final vs. the Nebraska Cornhuskers. She only allowed an unearned run to solidify her career ERA in 725.2 innings. She was one of the first NCAA Division I pitchers to accomplish a sub-1.00 ERA for a four-year career Debby Day and Christy Larsen were the first to pitch their entire careers from 43 ft., whereas all others prior to the 1988 season pitched from 40 ft. distance to the mound.

Shutouts
In addition, there are currently 23 pitchers in the sub-1.00 ERAs club that amassed at least 60 career shutouts:

Monica Abbott – 112; Michele Granger – 94; Cat Osterman – 85; Debbie Nichols – 84; Rhonda Wheatly – 83; Alicia Hollowell – 81; Jamie Southern – 79; Courtney Blades – 77; Sarah Dawson 74; Shawn Andaya – 73; Terry Carpenter – 73; Danielle Henderson – 71; Debby Day – 70; Brandice Balschmiter – 68; Amanda Scott – 68; Debbie Doom – 66; Keira Goerl – 64; Stephani Williams – 64; Stacey Johnson – 62; Lisa Longaker – 61; Susie Parra – 61; Amy Unterbrink – 61; Stacey Nelson – 60.

Records & Milestones
Courtney Blades won the most games with an NCAA record 52 and 0.89 ERA in 2000 and also has the most earned runs in a career for the list at 176. As a sophomore in 1988, Debbie Nichols tossed another NCAA all-time and Sophomore Class record 36 shutouts, producing an 0.53 ERA. Rhonda Wheatly pitched the all-time and Sophomore Class record 434.1 innings and had an 0.27 ERA. Maureen Brady threw just 41.1 innings as a freshman in a non-injury season and had an 0.85 ERA. Debbie Doom set the all-time Junior Class ERA record in 1984 by giving up a list best 3 earned runs for a 0.10 ERA; Melanie Parrent matched that earned run total as a freshman and had an 0.25 ERA. Doom also surrendered the fewest earned runs on the list for a career at 30. The most earned runs allowed by a pitcher on the list is 66 by Nicole Myers in her freshman campaign for a 2.05 ERA. Stacey Nelson had the highest ERA on the list in her freshman year of 2006 at 2.10. The most career innings thrown by a pitcher on the list is Monica Abbott's NCAA record 1448.0; Vicki Morrow pitched 700.2 for her career, the minimal innings of any pitcher on the list.

Along with Doom's 1984 ERA, Karen Snelgrove (0.18 ERAs in 1991–1992) and Tami Johnston (0.21 ERA in 1985) rank in the top-10 for an NCAA season in ERA. Additionally, Lisa Longaker (0.29 ERA in 1988), Tiffany Boyd (0.24 ERA in 1989), Snelgrove in 1991, Trinity Johnson (0.37 ERA in 1997), Amanda Scott (0.24 and 0.40 ERAs in 1999–2000), Amanda Freed (0.46 ERA in 2001), Jamie Southern (0.44 and 0.54 ERAs in 2002, 2004), Cat Osterman (0.37, 0.36 and 0.41 ERAs in 2003, 2005–2006), Angela Tincher (0.56 and 0.63 ERAs in 2007–2008) and Stacey Nelson (0.61 ERA in 2009) were tops for those NCAA seasons.

Finally, Doom (0.31, 0.10 and 0.27 ERAs in 1982 and 1984–1985), Susan LeFebvre (0.27 ERA in 1986), Shawn Andaya (0.44 ERA in 1987), Boyd (0.29 ERA in 1989), Debby Day (0.49 ERA in 1991), Susie Parra (0.43, 0.63 and 1.04 ERAs in 1991, 1993–1994), Scott (0.79 ERA in 1998), Freed (0.96 ERA in 1999), Keira Goerl (0.63 and 1.02 ERAs in 2003–2004), Jennie Ritter (0.92 ERA in 2005) and Alicia Hollowell (0.89 ERA in 2006) all won NCAA National Championships those years; Marcie Green and Parra each matched the Women's College World Series record with a zero ERA in 1990 and 1992 respectively, each throwing the second-most innings pitched without allowing an earned run at a series. For their careers, Lisa Ishikawa (Big 10),  Scott (WAC), Terri Whitmarsh (MVC), Johnston (MAC), Sarah Pauly (Big South), Danielle Henderson (A-10), Abbott (SEC), Lindsay Chouinard (USA), Nicole Terpstra (Summit) and Nicole Myers (A-Sun) all hold their conference crowns for earned run average.

References

External links
 NCAA Division I softball career wins list
 NCAA Division I softball career strikeouts list

College softball in the United States lists